The All-Ireland Senior B Hurling Championship of 1992 was the 19th staging of Ireland's secondary hurling knock-out competition.  Carlow won the championship, beating London 2-15 to 3-10 in the final at the Emerald GAA Grounds, Ruislip.

References

 Donegan, Des, The Complete Handbook of Gaelic Games (DBA Publications Limited, 2005).

1992
B